Baabul is a 2006 Indian Hindi-language drama film, directed by Ravi Chopra. The movie stars Amitabh Bachchan, Hema Malini, Salman Khan, Rani Mukherji and John Abraham. The film celebrates B. R. Chopra's 50 years in cinema, though it was unsuccessful at the box office.

Plot 

Balraj Kapoor (Amitabh Bachchan) is a rich businessman, happy and content with his world.  He and his wife Shobhna (Hema Malini) live happily together and they wait for their only son Avinash a.k.a. 'Avi' (Salman Khan) to return from his studies in the United States. After an absence of 7 years, Avinash comes back to India.  He reunites with his parents at the airport and races home. Back home, Avi joins his father's business.

One day they decide to go golfing and Balraj accidentally hits the ball which ruins a painting. The young woman painting the picture, Malvika a.k.a. 'Millie' (Rani Mukherji) gets furious with Balraj and leaves.  Later on, Avi runs into Millie on the golf course, and they start to talk.  Millie tells him that a stupid old man ruined her painting and points out that it was Balraj, but she doesn't know that the 'old man' is Avi's father and he doesn't tell her.  They start to hang out together while slowly falling in love with each other.

When Millie comes home, she is visited by her childhood friend Rajat (John Abraham). She tells him that she loves someone, which devastates him because he is also in love with her.  One day, Millie goes to Avi's office to drop off a painting and finds out that Balraj is Avi's father.  When Avi shows up, she leaves the office crying.  He chases after her and says that the only reason he lied to her was that he loves her.  She doesn't accept his apology right then, but when Balraj apologizes to her for ruining her painting, she forgives them both.

Avi asks Millie to get dressed up for a party at his house. When she arrives, there is no one except Avi. He proposes to her and she accepts.  The whole family visits Millie's house to discuss marriage and everyone agrees, except Rajat. He tells Avi that he will let Avi marry Millie if only he promises to always keep her happy and never let her get sad. Avi and Millie get married and soon they are expecting a child. Millie's birth-pains begin while she is in yoga class. Avi rushes her to the hospital where they are blessed with a healthy baby boy. They name the child Ansh.

Ansh grows up to be a sweet and intelligent boy. The family throws a birthday bash for him on his birthday. They wait for Avi to get back home from work, but he never turns up; he is killed in a road mishap, leaving Millie devastated.

Balraj seeks to bring happiness back into his widowed daughter-in-law's life. He gets into contact with Rajat. He learns that Rajat still loves Millie. Balraj asks Rajat to marry Millie. However, there is stiff opposition from Shobhna (Avi's mother) and Balraj's conservative older brother Balwant (Om Puri). Shobhna fears to lose her grandson Ansh, while Balwant takes the traditional Indian view that a widow with a child should devote herself to raising her child and think of nothing else and that a woman marrying twice is committing a mortal sin. However, Balraj stands firm and convinces everyone. In the end, Rajat and Millie get married, and everything is well. Avinash comes in as a spirit and blesses his dad with happiness.

Cast
 Amitabh Bachchan as Balraj Kapoor, a rich businessman who shares a strong bond with his son Avinash. After Avi dies, he is willing to seek happiness in his daughter-in-law Millie’s life once again by getting her married to Rajat.
 
 Hema Malini as Shobhna Kapoor, Balraj’s wife, Avinash’s mother, Millie’s mother-in-law, and Ansh’s grandmother.

 Salman Khan as Avinash Kapoor, he is Balraj and Shobhna’s only son who shares a strong bond with his father referring him as “Buddy”. He joins his father’s business firm and becomes a businessman as well. He is the husband of Millie and the father of Ansh. He dies in a car accident causing Millie to fall through depression.
Rani Mukherji as Malvika "Milli" Kapoor (nee Talwar), an aspiring artist who becomes Avinash’s wife and is the mother of their son Ansh. She goes into a deep depression after Avinash dies and misses him very much.

John Abraham as Rajat Verma, he is Millie’s childhood friend who is also in love with her. After Avinash’s death, he is sought out by Balraj to bring happiness into Millie’s life again and marry her.

 Om Puri as Balwant Kapoor, Balraj’s older brother who is strictly bound by old ways of marriage and is very religious. In the end he realizes his folly and gives his consent to Millie and Rajat's marriage.

 Sarika as Pushpa Kapoor, Balraj and Balwant's widowed younger sister-in-law who has always been looked down upon by Balwant for being a widow.
 Aman Verma as Shobhna's brother
 Parmeet Sethi as Khushi Kapoor, Balwant's son
 Sharat Saxena as J Talwar, Malvika's father
 Smita Jaykar as Suman Talwar, Malvika's mother
 Rajpal Yadav as Paanchi, the Kapoor Household servant and chauffeur 
 Shriya Saran (Cameo)
 Vaishnavi Mahant

Music 
The music is composed by Aadesh Shrivastava. The soundtrack has 11 songs. The soundtrack was one of the most successful soundtracks of 2006.

Reception

Box office 
Baabul opened in Mumbai with occupancy of about 75%, considered remarkably low for a Salman Khan-starrer, and occupancy went downhill very quickly, presumably due to unfavorable word-of-mouth. In the rest of the country, even the opening was dismal and it never picked up. Eventually, the film was declared a flop. The small centres opened to poor response and overall the film did not do quite well in India but was an above average grosser. However, it did great business overseas, entering at the 8th position on the UK charts in its first week. It was a big hit in the overseas market.

Critical response 
The Times Of India gave a 3/5 rating, saying, "The problem with Baabul is its first half- completely dead and totally listless. Samrat Sharma of Fullhyderabad.com wrote: "It's a film made for the more traditional generation or social class, and even so, while may not be terribly effective, it is sufficiently well-crafted..." Namrata Joshi of Outlook India gave the film 2 out 4, writing "Despite the failings in his character, Big B lends it gravitas and dignity. But his self-conscious cute couple act with Hema Malini is irritating. Time to get over Baghban.

Awards 
Nominated

 52nd Filmfare Awards: Best Supporting Actor – John Abraham

See also
Babul

References

External links
 

2006 films
2000s Hindi-language films
Rajshri Productions films
Films scored by Aadesh Shrivastava
Films directed by Ravi Chopra
Indian drama films
Golden jubilees
2006 drama films
Hindi-language drama films